Macrocilix mysticata is a moth in the family Drepanidae first described by Francis Walker in 1863. It is found in India, Myanmar, Taiwan, Japan and China.

The wingspan is 31–38 mm. Adults are on wing in March and August.

The larvae feed on the leaves of Castanopsis formosana and Pasania konishii. Mature larvae spin silk and curve the leaf, making a compact oval, whitish cocoon where pupation takes place.

Subspecies
Macrocilix mysticata mysticata (northern India, Sikkim, Myanmar)
Macrocilix mysticata brevinotata Watson, 1968 (China: Sichuan)
Macrocilix mysticata campana H.F. Chu & L.Y. Wang, 1988 (China: Sichuan, Chejiang, Jiangxi, Guangxi, Fujien)
Macrocilix mysticata flavotincta Wileman, 1915 (Taiwan)
Macrocilix mysticata watsoni Inoue, 1958 (Japan, China: Fukien, Chekiang, Kwangtung, Yunnan, Sichuan)

References

Moths described in 1863
Drepaninae
Moths of Japan